The help is a pejorative term for domestic workers. It may also refer to:

 The Help, 2009 novel by Kathryn Stockett
 The Help (film), 2011 film based on the novel
 The Help (TV series), 2004 American sitcom television series